The 2013–14 Tunisian Ligue Professionnelle 1 (Tunisian Professional League) season was the 88th season of top-tier football in Tunisia. The competition began on 15 September 2013 and ended on May 13, 2014. The defending champions from the previous season were Club Sportif Sfaxien. In the 2013-14 league season, Club Africain drew the highest average home attendance (9,000), followed by ES Tunis (8,273).

Results

League table

Result table

Leaders

Top scorers

See also
 2013–14 Tunisian Ligue Professionnelle 2
 2013–14 Tunisian Cup

References

External links
2013–14 Ligue 1 on RSSSF.com

2013–14 in African association football leagues
2013-14
1